Cyl or CyL or CYL may refer to:

 Cylindrospermopsin, a cyanotoxin produced by a variety of freshwater cyanobacteria
 Spanish initialism for Castile and León, an autonomous community of Spain
 an abbreviation used in eyeglass prescription

People with the surname
 Agnieszka Cyl (born 1984), Polish athlete
 Wawrzyniec Cyl (1900–1974), Polish footballer

See also
 CYL (disambiguation)
 Syl